The 1975 Dayton Pro Tennis Classic, was a men's tennis tournament played on indoor carpet courts at the UD Arena in Dayton, Ohio, in the United States that was part of the 1975 USLTA Indoor Circuit. It was the second edition of the event and was held from January 28 through February 2, 1975. First-seeded Brian Gottfried won the singles title and earned $8,000 first-prize money.

Finals

Singles
 Brian Gottfried defeated  Geoff Masters 6–4, 4–6, 6–4
 It was Gottfried's 2nd singles title of the year and the 5th of his career.

Doubles
 Ray Ruffels /  Allan Stone defeated  Paul Gerken /  Brian Gottfried 7–6, 7–6

References

External links
 ITF tournament edition details

Dayton Pro Tennis Classic
Dayton Pro Tennis Classic
Dayton Pro Tennis Classic